The 2007 South Korean hostage crisis in Afghanistan began on 19 July 2007, when 23 South Korean missionaries were captured and held hostage by members of the Taliban while passing through Ghazni Province of Afghanistan. Two male hostages were executed before the deal was reached between the Taliban and the South Korean government.  The group, composed of sixteen women and seven men, was captured while traveling from Kandahar to Kabul by bus on a mission sponsored by the Saemmul Presbyterian Church. The crisis began when two local men, who the driver had allowed to board, started shooting to bring the bus to a halt. Over the next month, the hostages were kept in cellars and farmhouses and regularly moved in groups of three to four.

Of the 23 hostages captured, two men, Bae Hyeong-gyu, a 42-year-old South Korean pastor of Saemmul Church, and Shim Seong-min, a 29-year-old South Korean man, were executed on 25 and 30 July, respectively. Later, with negotiations making progress, two women, Kim Gyeong-ja and Kim Ji-na, were released on 13 August and the remaining 19 hostages on 29 and 30 August.

The release of the hostages was secured with a South Korean promise to withdraw its 200 troops from Afghanistan by the end of 2007. Although the South Korean government offered no statement, a Taliban spokesman claimed that the militant group also received some US$20 million in exchange for the safety of the captured missionaries.

Negotiations

As South Korea was already scheduled to withdraw its 200 troops by the end of the year, the Taliban's initial demand was only that they hold to this plan, but later also sought the release of 23 Taliban militants from prison. South Korean representatives in Washington DC requested a meeting with Afghanistan Kidnap / Ransom experts from SCG International Risk on August 1. SCG then began advising the South Koreans on ways to resolve the crisis.

The Taliban issued and extended several deadlines for the release of the prisoners, after which they threatened to begin killing the hostages. Freedom for the militants was ruled out when it was apparent the South Korean negotiators could not secure the release of Afghan prisoners, as Afghan president Hamid Karzai had previously faced criticism for freeing five rebel prisoners in exchange for an Italian hostage.

Face-to-face meetings between the Taliban and South Korea began on 10 August, resulting in the release of two female hostages, Kim Ji-na and Kim Gyeong-ja, on 13 August. However, on 18 August, a spokesman said that the talks had failed and the fates of the hostages were being considered.

Release

The freedom of the remaining nineteen hostages (fourteen women and five men) was secured on August 28 with the participation of Indonesia as a neutral country. They were eventually released on 29 and 30 August.

After the release, a Taliban official announced that South Korea had paid the Taliban more than US$20 million in ransom for the lives of the hostages. However, South Korea stated that they have made a promise with the Taliban that they would not make any statements about the ransom.

Response

Public gatherings were held in South Korea during the capture to pray for the safety of the hostages.
Muslims residing in South Korea also expressed their grief regarding the incident and avow that the acts of the Taliban are against the principles of Islam. Many South Koreans nevertheless held numerous protests and demonstrations outside the Seoul Central Mosque.

On the other hand, many South Koreans were critical of the hostages, as the hostages were conducting Christian missionary service in Islamic Afghanistan despite the Ministry of Foreign Affairs and Trade's repeated warnings that Taliban has plans to kidnap South Koreans in order to free imprisoned militants.

Among these criticising the deal from the government as a dangerous precedent was the bishop of Taejon and chairman of Korea Caritas Lazarus You Heung-sik.

Timeline

On 19 July 2007, a number of South Korean citizens are reported to have been captured by the Taliban from a public bus traveling in the Ghazni Province, from Kandahar to Kabul, and held hostage. The next day the Taliban demanded that all South Korean forces be withdrawn from Afghanistan within 24 hours and also that Afghan president Hamid Karzai release all Taliban inmates. On 21 July South Korean president Roh Moo-hyun gave a national televised speech informing the public of the kidnappings. The Taliban reduced its demand to twenty-three Taliban prisoners in exchange for the lives of the hostages.

 On 24 July, the Taliban demanded a sum of $US100,000 in exchange for the right to contact the hostages via phone. The South Korean government refused. The following day, one of the South Korean hostages was executed. South Korea's foreign ministry identified the victim as 42-year-old South Korean pastor Bae Hyeong-gyu, who was the leader of the group. On 29 July, a final deadline was set by the Taliban for 30 July at 07:30 UTC. The next day, the Taliban extended the deadline for the seventh time by 4 hours to 1130 UTC to give Afghan officials more time to negotiate. A Taliban spokesperson later announced another male hostage had been killed because the government did not cede to the group's demands. This was later confirmed when the body of 29-year-old Shim Seong-min was found in the village of Arzoo (50 miles from where the kidnapping took place).
 On 31 July, the deadline was extended to 1 August at 07:30 UTC.
 On 1 August, South Korean officials meet with SCG International Risk Kidnap / Ransom consultants at the South Korean Embassy in Washington DC.
 On 1 August and at 12:00 UTC, another deadline passed, while the local governor said the Taliban militants have agreed to a face-to-face meeting requested by South Korea's ambassador. North Korea also called for the release of the hostages.
 On 2 August at 12:00 UTC, South Korean hostage negotiators agreed to direct talks with Taliban kidnappers in Afghanistan.
 On 10 August and at 16:00 UTC, the Taliban began the first round of face-to-face talks with a South Korean team concerning the hostages. The talks were held in an area under the control of the Afghan government in Ghazni province. Two top Taliban leaders and four South Korean officials met at the office of the Afghan Red Crescent in Ghazni, along with four members of the International Committee of the Red Cross (ICRC).
 On 13 August two female hostages were released as a goodwill gesture. The Taliban had originally decided to free Lee Ji-yeong, but she allowed another hostage to take her place.
 On 18 August, the Taliban announced that the face-to-face talks with the South Koreans had failed and that they were considering the fate of the remaining hostages.
 On 28 August, a breakthrough in the negotiations was announced with the Taliban agreeing to release the remaining hostages on the condition that South Korea withdraw its two-hundred non-combat troops within the year and suspend missionary work in Afghanistan. Indonesia was a neutral Muslim party in these negotiations.
 On 29 August, a total of twelve hostages were released.
 On 30 August, the remaining seven hostages were released, bringing an end to the crisis.
 On 1 September, South Korean President Roh Moo Hyun called Afghan President Hamid Karzai and Indonesian President Susilo Bambang Yudhoyono to thank them for their help in getting the hostages released. Karzai praised the negotiation of the South Korean government.
 In December 2009, the South Korean defence ministry announced the army would return to Afghanistan with 350 troops in 2010 to protect South Korean civilian engineers working on reconstruction. These troops would not engage in any fighting except to protect the aid team and be backed by helicopters, armoured vehicles and an unmanned reconnaissance drone to protect the 100 civilian engineers and 40 police. The South Korean contingent would be based in Parwan province, just north of Kabul for 30 months from 1 July 2010.

List of hostages

See also

Foreign relations of South Korea

References 

2007 murders in Afghanistan
Foreign hostages in Afghanistan
2007 in South Korea
South Korean people taken hostage
Hostage taking in Afghanistan
Terrorist incidents in Afghanistan in 2007
Afghanistan–South Korea relations
History of Ghazni Province